Thumpamon Diocese is one of the 30 dioceses of the Malankara Orthodox Syrian Church. The diocese was created after the Mulanthuruthy Synod in 1876. Kuriakose Mar Clemis is the Metropoliton of the diocese. The head office is located in St. Basil Aramana, Pathanamthitta. The diocese was named Thumpamon Diocese, opted from "Thumpamon pally" where St.Gregorious of Parumala (Geevarghese Mar Gregorios) had lived his ministerial life and had been in the administration of Thumpamon diocese.

History

Thumpamon is one of the seven dioceses created after the Mulanthuruthi Christian association (synod) conducted under the leadership of Ignatios Pathros III, Patriarch of Antioch in 1876. Others are Kottayam, Kandanadu, Angamali, Niranam, Kollam, Kochi. The diocese was created with 21 churches. Konatu Geevarghese Mar Yulios was the first metropolitan and led the diocese from 1876 to 1884. After this Parumala Thirumeni led diocese from 1884 to 1902. Thumpamon English Middle School was founded in this time. In 1913, Yuyakim Mar Evanios become metropolitan. In 1930, Puthencavu Mar Pilexinos become metropolitan. During this time, so many institutions founded under the diocese .

The Bishop's house (Aramana) of the diocese was built by Puthencav kochu Thirumeni (Geevarghese Mar Philoxenos) who was also the founder of the then Catholicate High School ,at present known as Catholicate College which became the blessing and guiding path of education for the people of Pathanamtitta. 

Daniel Mar Pilexinos led the diocese from 1953 to 1990 December. Philipos Mar Yusebios become assistant metropolitan in 1985, and metropolitan in 1991.
Dionysious V, Dionysious VI, Baselios Geevarghese II, Baselios Augen I led the diocese for short periods at different times. In 1992, there were 101 parishes and 12 chapels in diocese.

Metropolitans

1) Konattu Geevarghese Mar Yulios (1876-1884)

2)St .Chathuruthiyil Geevarghese Mar Gregorios (1884-1902)

3)Pulikkottil Joseph Mar Dionysius 2nd (5) as Malankara Metropolitan (1902-1909)

4) St. Vattasseril Geevarghese Mar Dionysius 6th as Malankara Metropolitan (1909-1912)

5)Karavattu Yuyakkim Mar Ivanios (1913-1925)

6)Kallasseril Geevarghese Mar Gregorios (Later H.H Baselios Geevarghese 2 )(1925-1929)

7)St . Vattasseril  Geevarghese Mar Dionysius 6th as Malankara Metropolitan ( 1930-1934)

8)Kizhakkethalakkal Geevarghese Mar Philexinos ( 1934-1951)

9)Cheruvillil Augen Mar Thimotheos ( Later H.H Baselios Augen 1 )(1951-1953)

10)Baselios Geevarghese 2 as Malankara Metropolitan (1953-1960)

11)Daniel Mar Philexinos (1960-1990) 

12)Philippose Mar Eusebios ( 1991-2009) 

13)Perumethmannil Kuriakose Mar Clemis ( 2009- present )

Assistant metropolitans

1) Kizhakkethalakkal Geevarghese Mar Philexinos Episcopa (1930-1934)

2) Daniel Mar Philexinos Episcopa (1953-1960)

3) Philippose Mar Eusebios Episcopa  (1985-1990)

4)H.G Dr.Abraham Mar Seraphim Metropolitan(2023-present)

Parishes

1) Amakkunnu St.George Orthodox Valiyapali

2) Angadicka Mar Baselios Gregorios Orthodox Church

3) Angadickal St.George Orthodox Church

4) Arruvappulam St.George Orthodox Church

5) Athirumkal St.George Orthodox Church

6) Attachakal Mar Pelexinos Orthodox Valiyapali

7) Attachakal St.Peter's Orthodox

8) Chadanapally St.George Orthodox Valiyapali

9) Chandanapally St.Thomas Orthodox

10) Chengara St.George Orthodox Church

11) Elicode St.George Orthodox Church

12) Ellimullumplakal St.George Orthodox Church

13) Kadamanitta St.Johns Orthodox

14) Kaipattor St.Ignatious Orthodox Maha Edavaka

15) Kalleli Mar Kuriakose Orthodox Church

16) Kalleli St.George Orthodox Church

17) Kalleli Thottam St.Thomas Orthodox Church

18) Karoor St.Peters Orthodox Church

19) Kizakkupuram St.George Orthodox Church

20) Kizhavaloor St.Peters Orthodox Valiyapali

21) Kodumon St.Behanans Orthodox Valiyapali

22) Kokkathodu St.George Orthodox Church

23) Konnapara St.Peters Orthodox Church

24) Konni Mangaram St.Marys Orthodox Church

25) Konni St.George Orthodox Maha Edavaka

26) Kozencherry St.Mathews Orthodox Valiyapali

27) Kudappanakkulam St.Marys Orthodox Church

28) Kumbazha St.Marys Orthodox Cathedral

29) Kumbazha St.Simeon Destuni Orthodox Cathedral

30) Kureeleeyam St.Johns Orthodox Church

31) Lakkoor St.Marys Orthodox Church

32) Makkamkunu St.Stephens Orthodox Cathedral

33) Mallasherry St.Marys Orthodox Church

34) Manarakulanji Mar Baselios Gregorios Orthodox Church

35) Manneera Mar Philoxenos Orthodox Church

36) Mulanthara St.Marys Orthodox Church

37) Mullanikadu St.Marys Orthodox Valiyapali

38) Mylapra St.George Orthodox Valiyapali

39) Nannuvakadu St.Gregorios Orthodox Valiyapali

40) Naranganum Mar Osios Orthodox Church

41) Nariyapuram Immanuel Orthodox Valiyapali

42) Nedumonkavu St.Thomas Orthodox Church

43) Njakkukavu  St.Marys Orthodox Church

44) Ommallor St.Thomas Orthodox Valiyapali

45) Onnukal St.George Orthodox Church

46) Palamoodu Mar Kuriakose Orthodox Church

47) Panackal Mar Bursouma Orthodox Church

48) Parakulam Mar Gregorios Orthodox Church 

49) Pathanamthitta Mar Gregorios Orthodox Church

50) Ponnambi St.George Orthodox Church

51) Prakkanam St.Marys Orthodox Valiyapali

52) Puthenpeedika North St.Marys Orthodox Church

53) Puthenpeedika St.Marys Orthodox Valiyapali

54) Thalachira Mar Yeldho Mar Baselios Orthodox Church

55) Thannithode St Antony's Orthodox Valiyapali

56) Thatta St.George Catholicate Simhasana Pali

57) Thatta St.Marys Orthodox Church

58) Thekkuthode St.George Orthodox Church

59) Thekkuthode St.Thomas  Orthodox Church

60) Thonniyamala St.George Orthodox Church

61) Thoompakulam St.Marys Orthodox Church

62) Thottupuram St.Marys Orthodox Church

63) Thumpamon St.Marys Orthodox Cathedral

64) Thumpamon Bethany St.Marys

65) Thumpamon Eram St.George Orthodox Valiyapali

66) Thumpamon St.Marys Kadeeshtha Orthodox Church

67) Thumpamon St.Thomas Orthodox Church, Vayalinumpadinjaru

68) Ulanadu St.Johns Orthodox Valiyapali

69) V.Kottayam St.Marys Orthodox Church

70) V.Kottayam St.George Orthodox Church

71) Vadakkupuram St Mary's Orthodox Church

72) Vakayar St.Marys Orthodox Valiyapali

73) Vakayar Kolenpady St.Gregorios Orthodox Church

74) Vanchitra Mar Bes Hanania Orthodox Church

75) Variyapuram St.Gregorios Orthodox Church

76) Vattakavu St.Peters and St.Pauls Orthodox Church

77) Vazhamuttom East Mar Bursouma Orthodox Church

78) Vazhamuttom Mar Behanan Orthodox Valiyapali

79) Vettipuram St.Mary's Orthodox

80) Vettipuram West St.George Orthodox

81) Vettoor St.Marys Orthodox Church

References

External links
Website of Malankara Orthodox Church

Malankara Orthodox Syrian Church dioceses
1876 establishments in India